The crash of Aerolíneas Argentinas Flight 670 was an accident involving a Douglas DC-4 of the Argentinian airline Aerolíneas Argentinas in San Carlos de Bolívar, Argentina on 8 December 1957, killing all 61 people on board.

Accident 
Aerolíneas Argentinas Flight 670 took off from Ministro Pistarini International Airport in Buenos Aires, Argentina at 3.54 pm on 8 December 1957 on a scheduled flight to San Carlos de Bariloche International Airport in Bariloche, Argentina, carrying 6 crew and 55 passengers. The captain of Flight 670 executed this tactic in an effort to avoid an intense cold front by flying under it. The captain ultimately flew the aircraft into the worsening storm at its most active part, and proceeded to climb sharply. At 4.45 pm, Flight 670 crashed 25 kilometres (16 miles) Southeast of San Carlos de Bolívar at a descent angle of 35 degrees and a 25 degree left bank while going over 400 km/h (248 mph). The aircraft was destroyed by the impact and post-crash fire. None of the plane's 61 occupants survived the crash.

Aircraft 
The Douglas DC-4 involved, registered LV-AHZ (msn 27227) was built in 1944 for the US Air Force. It remained in their service until March 1946, when it was sold to United Airlines. The aircraft was taken out of service in January 1957 and subsequently sold to Aerolíneas Argentinas in May 1957, where the aircraft remained until its last flight on 8 December 1957.

Aftermath 
The aircraft was destroyed in the accident, while all 61 occupants of the flight were killed. An investigation of the accident revealed that the aircraft disintegrated in flight due to the breaking off of the left wing and tail section following the stresses the aircraft received from severe turbulence in the harsh weather conditions. The pilot's decision to fly recklessly into the storm is seen as a contributing factor to the accident.

References 

Aerolíneas Argentinas accidents and incidents
Airliner accidents and incidents caused by in-flight structural failure
Airliner accidents and incidents caused by weather
1957 in Argentina
Aviation accidents and incidents in 1957
Accidents and incidents involving the Douglas DC-4
Aviation accidents and incidents in Argentina
Aviation accidents and incidents caused by loss of control
Aviation accidents and incidents caused by wake turbulence
December 1957 events
December 1957 events in South America